"National Museum of Poland" is the common name for several of the country's largest and most notable museums.  Poland's National Museum comprises several independent branches, each operating a number of smaller museums.  The main branch is the National Museum in Kraków, established in 1879 with permanent collections consisting of several hundred thousand items – kept in big part at the Main Building (along the 3 Maja St.), but also in the eight of its divisions around the city.

Poland's national museums include
 National Museum, Kraków (main branch of National Museum of Poland)
 Czartoryski Foundation and Czartoryski Museum
 Sukiennice
 Jan Matejko Manor
 Stanisław Wyspiański Museum
 Józef Mehoffer House
 Szołayski Family house
 Emeryk Hutten-Czapski Museum and Palace
 Villa Atma, Zakopane Karol Szymanowski Museum

 National Museum, Warsaw (central branch)
 Poster Museum at Wilanów
 Królikarnia, Xawery Dunikowski Museum of Sculpture
 Nieborów and Arkadia Museums
 Otwock Museum of Design
 Łowicz Regional Museum
 Museum of Jerzy Dunin-Borkowski in Krośniewice
 Łazienki Museum of Ignacy Jan Paderewski and the Polish Emigration to America

 National Museum, Gdańsk (central branch)
 Gdańsk–Oliwa Ethnographical Museum
 Gdańsk-Oliwa Museum of Modern Art
 Będomin Museum of the National Anthem
 National Maritime Museum, Gdańsk
 National Museum, Kielce at the Palace of the Kraków Bishops
 National Museum, Poznań
 National Museum, Szczecin (central branch) 
 The Museum of the History of the City of Szczecin
 The Maritime Museum
 Szczecin Gallery of Contemporary Art

 National Museum, Wrocław (central branch)
 Ethnographical Museum
 The Racławice Panorama Museum
 Lubiąż Museal Depot
 National Museum, Lublin
Among the many Museums of Poland around the world, there is also the Polish Museum of America in Chicago, the Polish American Museum in New York City and the Polish National Museum in Rapperswil, Switzerland.

References

Museums in Poland